Aristides Josuel dos Santos, also commonly known as Josuel dos Santos (born 14 June 1970), is a Brazilian former professional basketball player.

Career
During his pro club career, dos Santos won 4 Brazilian Championships, in the years 1993, 1995, 2002, and 2005.

With the senior Brazilian national basketball team, dos Santos competed at the men's basketball tournaments at the 1990 FIBA World Cup, the 1992 Summer Olympic Games, the 1994 FIBA World Cup, the 1996 Summer Olympic Games, and the 1998 FIBA World Cup.

References

External links
 

1970 births
Living people
Associação Bauru Basketball players
Basketball players at the 1992 Summer Olympics
Basketball players at the 1996 Summer Olympics
Brazilian men's basketball players
1990 FIBA World Championship players
Centers (basketball)
CR Vasco da Gama basketball players
Flamengo basketball players
Franca Basquetebol Clube players
Olympic basketball players of Brazil
Sport Club Corinthians Paulista basketball players
Basketball players from São Paulo
1998 FIBA World Championship players
1994 FIBA World Championship players